Rajaankanam is a 1976 Indian Malayalam film,  directed by Jeassy and produced by Chithrarekha. The film stars Sheela ,  Vincent , Jayan and K. P. Ummer in the lead roles. The film has musical score by M. K. Arjunan.

Cast

Vincent as Vinayan
M. G. Soman
Jayan as Babu
K. P. Ummer
Sheela 
KPAC Lalitha
Jose Prakash
Sadhana

Soundtrack
The music was composed by M. K. Arjunan and the lyrics were written by Appan Thacheth and Nelson.

References

External links
 

1976 films
1970s Malayalam-language films
Films directed by I. V. Sasi